This is a list of the suburbs, landmarks and selected other places located within the city of Plymouth, England.


Suburbs

Landmarks

Other places

See also
List of wards in Plymouth